Glorify Astrological Martyrdom is an album by Acid Mothers Temple & The Melting Paraiso U.F.O., released in 2008 by Important Records.

Release

The album was released on CD in 2008 and as a special tour edition LP in 2009. The LP was available in four colors (gold, silver, white and hot pink) limited to 100 copies each or on standard black vinyl, limited to 600 copies.

Track listing

Personnel

 Tsuyama Atsushi - Bass, Guitar, Recorder, Vocals, Alto Recorder, Bamboo Flute
 Higashi Hiroshi - Synthesizer
 Makoto Kawabata - Electric Guitar, Tamboura, Producer, Engineer, Tanpura, Audio Production, Audio Engineer
 Shimura Koji - Drums

Technical personnel

 Seldon Hunt - Artwork

References

2008 albums
Acid Mothers Temple albums
Important Records albums